The Gay Men's Chorus of San Diego (GMCSD), was a choral organization of gay male singers who performed from 1992 to 2009. The mission of The Gay Men's Chorus of San Diego was to express dedication to musical excellence by producing high quality choral performances, as well as to actively support and promote the gay community as goodwill ambassadors through music. GMCSD was a member of the Gay and Lesbian Association of Choruses (GALA) and the San Diego Performing Arts League.

Organization
The Gay Men's Chorus of San Diego was a non-profit organization that operated under the umbrella of Finest City Performing Arts, Inc. It was composed of 80-100 singers, with the number of participants fluctuating throughout the year. At the beginning of every season the group hosted an event called "Info Night" welcoming men who wished to sing with the chorus. During Info Night, Prospective singers underwent a simple audition process.
GMCSD was managed by a board of directors composed of elected directors and community members. Elections were held each year during the Spring Concert period.

Origins
GMCSD was a self-identified "gay" chorus that was incorporated January 1993 in San Diego, and began rehearsing in the Great Hall of the Cathedral Church of Saint Paul on 5th Avenue, under the artistic direction of Gary Holt.

Merger
In January 2010, The Gay Men's Chorus of San Diego formally merged with The San Diego Men's Chorus, forming a new performing arts entity titled the San Diego Gay Men's Chorus. Each of the two 'legacy' choruses participated under their separate names in a joint holiday concert at San Diego's Balboa Theatre in December 2009.

External links
 San Diego Gay Men's Chorus Official website
 GALA Choruses Official website

Choirs in California
Musical groups established in 1992
Musical groups from San Diego
GALA choruses
Gay men's choruses
1992 establishments in California
Gay culture in California
Musical groups disestablished in 2010
LGBT culture in San Diego